The idea of the Panama Canal dates back to 1517, when Vasco Núñez de Balboa first crossed the isthmus of Panama. The narrow land bridge between North and South America was a fine location to dig a water passage between the Atlantic and Pacific Oceans. The earliest European colonists recognized this, and several proposals for a canal were made.

By the late nineteenth century, technological advances and commercial pressure allowed construction to begin in earnest. Noted canal engineer Ferdinand de Lesseps led the initial attempt by France to build a sea-level canal. Beset by cost overruns due to the severe underestimation of the difficulties in excavating the rugged terrain, heavy personnel losses to tropical diseases, and political corruption in France surrounding the financing of the massive project, the canal was only partly completed.

Interest in a U.S.-led canal effort picked up as soon as France abandoned the project. Initially, the Panama site was politically unfavorable in the U.S. for a variety of reasons, including the taint of the failed French effort and the unfriendly attitude of the Colombian government (at the time, the owner of the land) towards the U.S. continuing the project. The U.S. first sought to construct a canal through Nicaragua instead.

French engineer and financier Philippe-Jean Bunau-Varilla played a key role in changing American attitudes. Bunau-Varilla had a large stake in the failed French canal company and stood to profit on his investment only if the Panama Canal was completed. Extensive lobbying of American lawmakers, coupled with his support of a nascent independence movement among the Panamanian people, led to a simultaneous revolution in Panama and the negotiation of the Hay–Bunau-Varilla Treaty which secured both independence for Panama and the right for the U.S. to lead a renewed effort to construct the canal. Colombia's response to the Panamanian independence movement was tempered by an American military presence; this is often cited as a classic example of the era of gunboat diplomacy. The leaders of the new government in breakaway Panama had no choice but to accept the canal treaty on one-sided U.S. terms. Had the U.S. withdrawn its warships, the Columbian army would have returned to Panama and hung all the members of the new government. This implied withdrawal threat was a "knife to the throat" of the new government. The U.S. bargaining with the French Compagnie Nouvelle du Canal de Panama was also one sided. The latter had to accept the $40 million offer or get nothing and see a canal built in Nicaragua.

American success hinged on two factors. First was converting the original French sea-level plan to a more realistic lock-controlled canal. The second was controlling the diseases which had decimated workers and management alike under the original French attempt. Initial chief engineer John Frank Stevens built much of the infrastructure necessary for later construction; slow progress on the canal itself led to his replacement by George Washington Goethals. Goethals oversaw the bulk of the excavation of the canal, including appointing Major David du Bose Gaillard to oversee the most daunting project, the Culebra Cut through the roughest terrain on the route. Almost as important as the engineering advances were the healthcare advances made during the construction, led by William C. Gorgas, an expert in controlling tropical diseases such as yellow fever and malaria. Gorgas was one of the first to recognize the role of mosquitoes in the spread of these diseases and, by focusing on controlling the mosquitoes, greatly improved worker conditions.

On 7 January 1914, the French crane boat Alexandre La Valley became the first to make the traverse, and on 1 April 1914 the construction was officially completed with the hand-over of the project from the construction company to the Canal Zone government. The outbreak of World War I caused the cancellation of any official "grand opening" celebration, but the canal officially opened to commercial traffic on 15 August 1914 with the transit of the SS Ancon.

During World War II, the canal proved a vital part of American military strategy, allowing ships to transfer easily between the Atlantic and Pacific. Politically, the canal remained a territory of the United States until 1977, when the Torrijos–Carter Treaties began the process of transferring territorial control of the Panama Canal Zone to Panama, a process completed on 31 December 1999.

The Panama Canal continues to be a viable commercial venture and a vital link in world shipping, and is periodically upgraded. The Panama Canal expansion project started construction in 2007 and began commercial operation on 26 June 2016. The new locks allow the transit of larger Post-Panamax and New Panamax ships, which have greater cargo capacity than the original locks could accommodate.

French project

The idea of a canal across Central America was revived during the early 19th century. In 1819, the Spanish government authorized the construction of a canal and the creation of a company to build it.

Although the project stalled for some time, a number of surveys were made between 1850 and 1875. They indicated that the two most-favorable routes were across Panama (then part of Colombia) and Nicaragua, with a third route across the Isthmus of Tehuantepec in Mexico another option. The Nicaraguan route was surveyed.

Conception

After the 1869 completion of the Suez Canal, France thought that an apparently similar project to connect the Atlantic and Pacific Oceans could be carried out with little difficulty. In 1876 a limited company, La Société Civile Internationale du Canal Interocéanique par l'isthme du Darien was created at the initiative of the Société de Géographie, dean of geography societies, to fill in gaps in the geographical knowledge of the Central American area for the purpose of building an interoceanic canal.
On March 20, 1878, the Société Civile obtained an exclusive 15 years concession from the Colombian government to build a canal across the isthmus of Panama, which at the time was a Department of Colombia; the waterway that would revert to the Colombian government after 99 years without compensation.

Ferdinand de Lesseps, who was in charge of the Suez Canal construction, headed the project. His enthusiastic leadership and his reputation as the man who had built the Suez Canal persuaded speculators and ordinary citizens to invest nearly $400 million in the project.

However, despite his previous success, Lesseps was not an engineer. The construction of the Suez Canal, essentially a ditch dug through a flat, sandy desert, presented few challenges. The sea-level canal proposed by de Lesseps would require a great deal of excavation through a variety of unstable rock, rather than Suez's sand.

Less-obvious barriers were the rivers crossing the canal, particularly the Chagres, which flows strongly during the rainy season. Since the water would be a hazard to shipping if it drained into the canal, a sea-level canal would require the river's diversion.

The most serious problem was tropical diseases, particularly malaria and yellow fever, whose methods of transmission were unknown at the time. The legs of hospital beds were placed in cans of water to keep insects from crawling up them, but the stagnant water was an ideal breeding place for mosquitoes (carriers of the diseases).

In May 1879, the Congrès International d'Etudes du Canal Interocéanique (International Congress for Study of an Interoceanic Canal), led by Lesseps, convened in Paris. Among the 136 delegates of 26 countries, 42 were engineers and made technical proposals before the congress. The others were speculators, politicians, and friends of Lesseps, for whom the purpose of this congress was only to launch fundraising by legitimizing Lesseps' own decision, based on the Lucien Bonaparte-Wyse and Armand Réclus plan, through a so-called international scientific approval, since he was convinced that a sea-level canal, dug through the mountainous spine of Central America, could be completed at least as easily as the Suez Canal.

In reality, only 19 engineers approved the chosen plan,  and only 1 of those had visited Central America.
While the Americans abstained because of their own plan through Nicaragua, the five delegates from the French Society of Engineers all refused. Among them were Gustave Eiffel and Adolphe Godin de Lépinay, the general-secretary of the Société de Géographie, who was the only one to propose a lake-and-locks project. Designer in particular of the large gauge canal between Bordeaux and Narbonne, the road between Sétif and Bougie, and of the railway lines connecting Philippeville to Constantine, Algeria, Algiers to Constantine, Athens to Piraeus, he also supervised the construction of the rail link between Veracruz and Córdoba, Mexico, losing two-thirds of his workers to tropical disease.

Godin de Lépinay's plan was to build a dam across the Chagres River in Gatún, near the Atlantic, and another on the Rio Grande, near the Pacific, to create an artificial lake accessed by locks. Digging less and avoiding unsanitary work and the danger of flooding was his priority, with an estimated lower cost of $100,000,000 and 50,000 lives saved, as mentioned in the motivation for his negative review. All was said. The bankruptcy of the Lesseps project is described clearly, without ambiguity. It will be technical and financial, as Godin de Lépinay had planned. Unfortunately, his innovative plan, the only profitable as said by the Americans engineers, received no serious attention from the congress. Had it been adopted, the Panama Canal might well have been completed by the French instead of by the United States.

Following the congress, the Compagnie Universelle du Canal Interocéanique de Panama, in charge of the construction, whose president was Lesseps, acquired the Wyse Concession from the Société Civile.

The engineering congress estimated the Lesseps project's cost at $214 million; on February 14, 1880, an engineering commission revised the estimate to $168.6 million. Lesseps reduced this estimate twice, with no apparent justification: on February 20 to $131.6 million and on March 1 to $120 million. The congress estimated seven or eight years as the time required to complete the canal; Lesseps reduced this estimate to six years (the Suez Canal required ten).

A dam was proposed at Gamboa to control flooding of the Chagres River, with channels to drain water away from the canal. However, the Gamboa dam was later found impracticable and the Chagres River problem was left unsolved.

Construction

Construction of the canal began on January 1, 1881, with digging at Culebra beginning on January 22. A large labor force was assembled, numbering about 40,000 in 1888 (nine-tenths of whom were afro-Caribbean workers from the West Indies). Although the project attracted good, well-paid French engineers, retaining them was difficult due to disease. The death toll from 1881 to 1889 was estimated at over 22,000, of whom as many as 5,000 were French citizens.

By 1885 it had become clear to many that a sea-level canal was impractical, and an elevated canal with locks was preferable; de Lesseps resisted, and a lock canal plan was not adopted until October 1887. By this time increasing mortality rates, as well as financial and engineering problems coupled with frequent floods and mudslides, indicated that the project was in serious trouble. Work continued under the new plan until May 15, 1889, when the company went bankrupt and the project was suspended. After eight years the canal was about two-fifths completed, and about $234.8 million had been spent.

The company's collapse was a scandal in France, and the antisemitic Edouard Drumont exploited the role of two Jewish speculators in the affair. One hundred and four legislators were found to have been involved in the corruption, and Jean Jaurès was commissioned by the French parliament to conduct an inquiry which was completed in 1893.

New Panama Canal Company
It soon became clear that the only way to recoup expenses for the stockholders was to continue the project. A new concession was obtained from Colombia, and in 1894 the Compagnie Nouvelle du Canal de Panama was created to finish the canal. To comply with the terms of the contract, work began immediately on the Culebra excavation while a team of engineers began a comprehensive study of the project. They eventually settled on a plan for a two-level, lock-based canal.

The new effort never gained traction, mainly because of US speculation that a canal through Nicaragua would render one through Panama useless. The most men employed on the new project was 3,600 (in 1896), primarily to comply with the terms of the concession and to maintain the existing excavation and equipment in saleable condition. The company had already begun looking for a buyer, with an asking price of $109 million.

In the US, a congressional Isthmian Canal Commission was established in 1899 to examine possibilities for a Central American canal and recommend a route. In November 1901, the commission reported that a US canal should be built through Nicaragua unless the French were willing to sell their holdings for $40 million. The recommendation became law on June 28, 1902, and the New Panama Canal Company was compelled to sell at that price.

Results
Although the French effort was effectively doomed to failure from the beginning due to disease and a lack of understanding of the engineering difficulties, it was not entirely futile. The old company dredged a channel from Panama Bay to the port at Balboa, and the channel dredged on the Atlantic side (known as the French canal) was useful for bringing in sand and stone for the locks and spillway concrete at Gatún.

Detailed surveys and studies (particularly those carried out by the new canal company) and machinery, including railroad equipment and vehicles, aided the later American effort. An estimated  of excavation, valued at about $25.4 million, and equipment and surveys valued at about $17.4 million were usable by the Americans.

Nicaraguan canal

The 1848 discovery of gold in California and the rush of would-be miners stimulated US interest in building a canal between the oceans. In 1887, a United States Army Corps of Engineers regiment surveyed canal possibilities in Nicaragua. Two years later, the Maritime Canal Company was asked to begin a canal in the area and chose Nicaragua. The company lost money in the panic of 1893, and its work in Nicaragua ceased. In 1897 and 1899, the United States Congress charged a canal commission with researching possible construction; Nicaragua was chosen as the location both times.

Although the Nicaraguan canal proposal was made redundant by the American takeover of the French Panama Canal project, increases in shipping volume and ship sizes have revived interest in the project. A canal across Nicaragua accommodating post-Panamax ships or a rail link carrying containers between ports on either coast have been proposed.

United States

Theodore Roosevelt believed that a US-controlled canal across Central America was a vital strategic interest of the country. This idea gained wide circulation after the destruction of the USS Maine in Cuba on February 15, 1898. Reversing a Walker Commission decision in favor of a Nicaraguan canal, Roosevelt encouraged the acquisition of the French Panama Canal effort. George S. Morison was the only commission member who argued for the Panama location. The purchase of the French-held land for $40 million was authorized by the June 28, 1902 Spooner Act. Since Panama was then part of Colombia, Roosevelt began negotiating with that country to obtain the necessary rights. In early 1903 the Hay–Herrán Treaty was signed by both nations, but the Senate of Colombia failed to ratify the treaty.

Roosevelt implied to Panamanian rebels that if they revolted, the US Navy would assist their fight for independence. Panama declared its independence on November 3, 1903, and the USS Nashville impeded Colombian interference. The victorious Panamanians gave the United States control of the Panama Canal Zone on February 23, 1904, for $10 million in accordance with the November 18, 1903 Hay–Bunau-Varilla Treaty.

Takeover

The United States took control of the French property connected to the canal on May 4, 1904, when Lieutenant Jatara Oneel of the United States Army was presented with the keys during a small ceremony. The new Panama Canal Zone Control was overseen by the Isthmian Canal Commission (ICC) during construction.

The first step taken by the US government was to place all the canal workers under the new administration. The operation was maintained at minimum strength to comply with the canal concession and keep the machinery in working order. The US inherited a small workforce and an assortment of buildings, infrastructure and equipment, much of which had been neglected for fifteen years in the humid jungle environment. There were no facilities in place for a large workforce, and the infrastructure was crumbling.

Cataloguing assets was a large job; it took many weeks to card-index available equipment. About 2,150 buildings had been acquired, many of which were uninhabitable; housing was an early problem, and the Panama Railway was in a state of decay. However, much equipment (such as locomotives, dredges and other floating equipment) was still serviceable.

Although chief engineer John Findley Wallace was pressured to resume construction, red tape from Washington stifled his efforts to obtain heavy equipment and caused friction between Wallace and the ICC. He and chief sanitary officer William C. Gorgas were frustrated by delay, and Wallace resigned in 1905. He was replaced by John Frank Stevens, who arrived on July 26, 1905. Stevens quickly realized that serious investment in infrastructure was necessary and determined to upgrade the railway, improve sanitation in Panama City and Colón, renovate the old French buildings and build hundreds of new ones for housing. He then began the difficult task of recruiting the large labor force required for construction. Stevens' approach was to press ahead first and obtain approval later. He improved drilling and dirt-removal equipment at the Culebra Cut for greater efficiency, revising the inadequate provisions in place for soil disposal.

No decision had been made about whether the canal should be a lock or a sea-level one; the ongoing excavation would be useful in either case. In late 1905, President Roosevelt sent a team of engineers to Panama to investigate the relative merits of both types in cost and time. Although the engineers voted eight to five in favor of a sea-level canal, Stevens and the ICC opposed the plan; Stevens' report to Roosevelt was instrumental in convincing the president of the merits of a lock canal and Congress concurred. In November 1906 Roosevelt visited Panama to inspect the canal's progress, the first trip outside the United States by a sitting president.

Whether contract employees or government workers would build the canal was controversial. Bids for the canal's construction were opened in January 1907, and Knoxville, Tennessee-based contractor William J. Oliver was the low bidder. Stevens disliked Oliver, and vehemently opposed his choice. Although Roosevelt initially favored the use of a contractor, he eventually decided that army engineers should carry out the work and appointed Major George Washington Goethals as chief engineer (under Stevens' direction) in February 1907. Stevens, frustrated by government inaction and the army involvement, resigned and was replaced by Goethals.

Workforce
The US relied on a stratified workforce to build the canal. High-level engineering jobs, clerical positions, skilled labor and jobs in supporting industries were generally reserved for Americans, with manual labor primarily by cheap immigrant labor. These jobs were initially filled by Europeans, primarily from Spain, Italy and Greece, many of whom were radical and militant due to political turmoil in Europe. The US then decided to recruit primarily from the British and French West Indies, and these workers provided most of the manual labor on the canal.

Living conditions

The Canal Zone originally had minimal facilities for entertainment and relaxation for the canal workers apart from saloons; as a result, alcohol abuse was a great problem. The inhospitable conditions resulted in many American workers returning home each year.

A program of improvements was implemented. Clubhouses were built, managed by the YMCA, with billiard, assembly and reading rooms, bowling alleys, darkrooms for camera clubs, gymnastic equipment, ice cream parlors, soda fountains and a circulating library. Member dues were ten dollars a year, with the remaining upkeep (about $7,000 at the larger clubhouses) paid by the ICC. The commission built baseball fields and arranged rail transportation to games; a competitive league soon developed. Semi-monthly Saturday-night dances were held at the Hotel Tivoli, which had a spacious ballroom.

These measures influenced life in the Canal Zone; alcohol abuse fell, with saloon business declining by 60 percent. The number of workers leaving the project each year dropped significantly.

US construction

The work done thus far was preparation, rather than construction. By the time Goethals took over, the construction infrastructure had been created or overhauled and expanded from the French effort and he was soon able to begin construction in earnest.

Goethals divided the project into three divisions: Atlantic, Central and Pacific. The Atlantic Division, under Major William L. Sibert, was responsible for construction of the breakwater at the entrance to Limon Bay, the Gatún locks and their  approach channel, and the Gatun Dam. The Pacific Division (under Sydney B. Williamson, the only civilian division head) was responsible for the Pacific entrance to the canal, including a  breakwater in Panama Bay, the approach channel, and the Miraflores and Pedro Miguel locks and their associated dams. The Central Division, under Major David du Bose Gaillard, was responsible for everything in between.

By August 1907, 765,000 m³ (1,000,000 cubic yards) per month was being excavated; this set a record for the rainy season; soon afterwards this doubled, before increasing again. At the peak of production, 2,300,000 m³ (3,000,000 cubic yards) were being excavated per month (the equivalent amount of spoil from the Channel Tunnel every 3½ months).

Culebra Cut

The effort to cut through this barrier of rock was one of the greatest challenges faced by the project.

Goethals arrived at the canal with Major David du Bose Gaillard of the US Army Corps of Engineers. Gaillard was placed in charge of the canal's Central Division, which stretched from the Pedro Miguel locks to the Gatun Dam, and dedicated himself to getting the Culebra Cut (as it was then known) excavated.

The scale of the work was massive. Landslides were frequent, due to the oxidation and weakening of the rock's underlying iron strata. Although the scale of the job and the frequent, unpredictable slides generated chaos, Gaillard provided quiet, clear-sighted leadership.

On May 20, 1913, Bucyrus steam shovels made a passage through the Culebra Cut at the level of the canal bottom. About  of this material was in addition to the planned excavation, due to landslides. Dry excavation ended on September 10, 1913; a January slide had added  of earth, but it was decided that this loose material would be removed by dredging when the cut was flooded.

Dams
Two artificial lakes are key parts of the canal: Gatun and Miraflores Lakes. Four dams were constructed to create them. Two small dams at Miraflores impound Miraflores Lake, and a dam at Pedro Miguel encloses the south end of the Culebra Cut (essentially an arm of Lake Gatun). The Gatun Dam is the main dam blocking the original course of the Chagres River, creating Gatun Lake.

The Miraflores dams are an  earth dam connecting the Miraflores Locks in the west and a  concrete spillway dam east of the locks. The concrete dam has eight floodgates, similar to those on the Gatun spillway. The earthen,  Pedro Miguel dam extends from a hill in the west to the lock. Its face is protected by rock riprap at the water level. The largest and most challenging of the dams is the Gatun Dam.

Locks

The original lock canal plan called for a two-step set of locks at Sosa Hill and a long Sosa Lake extending to Pedro Miguel.   In late 1907, it was decided to move the Sosa Hill locks further inland to Miraflores, mostly because the new site provided a more stable construction foundation. The resulting small lake Miraflores became a fresh water supply for Panama City.

Building the locks began with the first concrete laid at Gatun on August 24, 1909.

The Pacific-side locks were finished first: the single flight at Pedro Miguel in 1911, and Miraflores in May 1913. The seagoing tugboat Gatun, an Atlantic-entrance tug used to haul barges, traversed the Gatun locks on September 26, 1913. The trip was successful, although the valves were controlled manually; the central control board was not yet ready.

Opening
On October 10, 1913, the dike at Gamboa which had kept the Culebra Cut isolated from Gatun Lake was demolished; the detonation was made telegraphically by President Woodrow Wilson in Washington. On January 7, 1914, the Alexandre La Valley, an old French crane boat, became the first ship to make a complete transit of the Panama Canal under its own steam after working its way across during the final stages of construction.

As construction wound down, the canal team began to disperse. Thousands of workers were laid off, and entire towns were disassembled or demolished. Chief sanitary officer William C. Gorgas, who left to fight pneumonia in the South African gold mines, became surgeon general of the Army. On April 1, 1914, the Isthmian Canal Commission disbanded, and the zone was governed by a Canal Zone Governor; the first governor was George Washington Goethals.

Although a large celebration was planned for the canal's opening, the outbreak of World War I forced the cancellation of the main festivities and it became a modest local affair. The Panama Railway steamship , piloted by Captain John A. Constantine (the canal's first pilot), made the first official transit on August 15, 1914. With no international dignitaries in attendance, Goethals followed the Ancon progress by railroad.

Summary

The canal was a technological marvel and an important strategic and economic asset to the US. It changed world shipping patterns, removing the need for ships to navigate the Drake Passage and Cape Horn.

Its anticipated military significance of the canal was proven during World War II, when the canal helped restore the devastated United States Pacific Fleet. Some of the largest ships the United States had to send through the canal were aircraft carriers, particularly Essex class; they were so large that although the locks could accommodate them, the lampposts along the canal had to be removed.

The Panama Canal cost the United States about $375 million, including $10 million paid to Panama and $40 million paid to the French company. Although it was the most expensive construction project in US history to that time, it cost about $23 million less than the 1907 estimate despite landslides and an increase in the canal's width. An additional $12 million was spent on fortifications.

A total of over 75,000 people worked on the project; at the peak of construction, there were 40,000 workers. According to hospital records, 5,609 workers died from disease and accidents during the American construction era.

Of the three presidents whose terms spanned the construction period, Theodore Roosevelt is most associated with the canal and Woodrow Wilson presided over its opening. However, William Howard Taft may have given the canal its greatest impetus for the longest time. Taft visited Panama five times as Roosevelt's secretary of war and twice as president. He hired John Stevens and later recommended Goethals as Stevens' replacement. Taft became president in 1909, when the canal was half finished, and was in office for most of the remainder of the work. However, Goethals later wrote: "The real builder of the Panama Canal was Theodore Roosevelt".

The following words by Roosevelt are displayed in the rotunda of the canal's administration building in Balboa:

It is not the critic who counts, not the man who points out how the strong man stumbled, or where the doer of deeds could have done them better. The credit belongs to the man who is actually in the arena; whose face is marred by dust and sweat and blood; who strives valiantly, who errs and comes short again and again; who knows the great enthusiasms, the great devotions, and spends himself in a worthy cause; who, at the best, knows in the end the triumph of high achievement; and who, at the worst, if he fails, at least fails while daring greatly, so that his place shall never be with those cold and timid souls who know neither victory nor defeat.

David du Bose Gaillard died of a brain tumor in Baltimore on December 5, 1913, at age 54. Promoted to colonel only a month earlier, Gaillard never saw the opening of the canal whose creation he directed. The Culebra Cut (as it was originally known) was renamed the Gaillard Cut on April 27, 1915, in his honor. A plaque commemorating Gaillard's work stood over the cut for many years; in 1998 it was moved to the administration building, near a memorial to Goethals.

Third-lane plans

In the Treaty of the Danish West Indies, the United States purchased the Virgin Islands in 1917 in part to defend the Panama Canal. As the situation in Europe deteriorated during the late 1930s, the US again became concerned about its ability to move warships between the oceans. The largest US battleships already had problems with the canal locks, and there were concerns about the locks being incapacitated by bombing. These concerns were validated by several US Navy fleet problems, which showed that the canal's defenses were inadequate.

These concerns led Congress to pass a resolution on May 1, 1936, authorizing a study of improving the canal's defenses against attack and expanding its capacity to handle large vessels. A special engineering section was created on July 3, 1937, to carry out the study.
The section reported to Congress on February 24, 1939, recommending work to protect the existing locks and the construction of a new set of locks capable of carrying larger vessels than the existing locks could accommodate. On August 11, Congress authorized the work.

Three new locks were planned, at Gatún, Pedro Miguel and Miraflores, parallel to the existing locks with new approach channels.

The first excavations for the new approach channels at Miraflores began on July 1, 1940, following the passage by Congress of an appropriations bill on June 24, 1940. The first dry excavation at Gatún began on February 19, 1941. Considerable material was excavated before the project was abandoned, and the approach channels can still be seen paralleling the original channels at Gatún and Miraflores.

In 2006, the Autoridad del Canal de Panamá (the Panama Canal Authority, or ACP) proposed a plan creating a third lane of locks using part of the abandoned 1940s approach canals. Following a referendum, work began in 2007 and the expanded canal began commercial operations on June 26, 2016. After a two-year delay, the new locks allow the transit of Panamax ships (which have a greater cargo capacity than the original locks can handle). The first ship to cross the canal through the third set of locks was a Panamax container ship, the Chinese-owned Cosco Shipping Panama. The cost of the expansion was estimated at $5.25 billion.

Transfer to Panama

After construction, the canal and the Canal Zone surrounding it were administered by the United States. On September 7, 1977, US President Jimmy Carter signed the Torrijos-Carter Treaty setting in motion the process of transferring control of the canal to Panama. The treaty became effective on October 2, 1979, providing for a 20-year period in which Panama would have increasing responsibility for canal operations before complete US withdrawal on December 31, 1999. Since then, the canal has been administered by the Panama Canal Authority (Autoridad de Canal de Panama, or ACP).

The transfer of the canal came under heavy attack from conservatives, especially the American Conservative Union, the Conservative Caucus, the Committee for the Survival of a Free Congress, Citizens for the Republic, the American Security Council, the Young Republicans, the National Conservative Political Action Committee, the Council for National Defense, Young Americans for Freedom, the Council for Inter-American Security, and the Campus Republican Action Organization. The treaty narrowly passed with the required 2/3 vote in the Senate. Though Panamanians welcomed the return of sovereignty over the Panama Canal, many people at the time also expressed fears of the possible negative economic repercussions.

Although concerns existed in the US and the shipping industry about the canal after the transfer, Panama has exercised good stewardship. According to ACP figures, canal income increased from $769 million in 2000 (the first year under Panamanian control) to $1.4 billion in 2006. Traffic through the canal increased from 230 million tons in 2000 to nearly 300 million tons in 2006. The number of accidents has decreased from an average of 28 per year in the late 1990s to 12 in 2005. Transit time through the canal averages about 30 hours, about the same as during the late 1990s. Canal expenses have increased less than revenue, from $427 million in 2000 to $497 million in 2006. On October 22, 2006, Panamanian citizens approved a referendum to expand the canal.

Former US Ambassador to Panama Linda Ellen Watt, who served from 2002 to 2005, said that the canal operation in Panamanian hands has been "outstanding". "The international shipping community is quite pleased", Watt added.

See also
 Corozal "Silver" Cemetery – a cemetery near Panama City dedicated to workers on the Panama Canal.
 Latin America–United States relations
 Operation Pelikan

References

Further reading

 Collin, Richard H. Theodore Roosevelt's Caribbean: The Panama Canal, the Monroe Doctrine, & the Latin American Context (Louisiana State U. Press, 1990), 520pp
Greene, Julie. (2009). The Canal Builders: Making America's Empire at the Panama Canal. New York: The Penguin Press. 
 Lafeber, Walter. The Panama Canal: The Crisis in Historical Perspective (3rd ed. 1990), the standard scholarly account of diplomacy
McCullough, David. (1977). The Path Between the Seas: The Creation of the Panama Canal, 1870-1914. New York: Simon & Schuster. 
 Parker, Matthew. (2008).Panama Fever: The Epic Story of One of the Greatest Human Achievements of All Time—The Building of the Panama Canal.  Doubleday. 
 Smith, Gaddis. Morality Reason, and Power: American Diplomacy in the Carter Years (1986) pp 110–15.
 Strong, Robert A. "Jimmy Carter and the Panama Canal Treaties." Presidential Studies Quarterly (1991) 21.2: 269-286 online
 Swilling, Mary C. "The Business of the Canal: The Economics and Politics of the Carter Administration’s Panama Canal Zone Initiative, 1978." Essays in Economic & Business History (2012) 22:275-89. online
 Williams, Mary Wilhelmine. Anglo-American Isthmian Diplomacy, 1815–1915 (1916) online

Contemporary magazines
  Includes c. 1905 construction photos.

External links
 National Archives of Japan: Report of the Foreign Resident, photos (1913)
 1904 Convention Between the United States and the Republic of Panama (the Hay-Bunau-Varilla Treaty)
Open Collections Program: Contagion, Tropical Diseases and the Construction of the Panama Canal, 1904–1914

History of Panama
Panama Canal
Industrial history
Panama Canal
Panama–United States relations
Presidency of Theodore Roosevelt
Articles containing video clips